The 1944–45 Segunda División season was the 14th since its establishment and was played between 24 September 1944 and 20 May 1945.

Overview before the season
14 teams joined the league, including two relegated from the 1943–44 La Liga and three promoted from the 1943–44 Tercera División.

Relegated from La Liga
Real Sociedad
Celta Vigo

Promoted from Tercera División'''
Real Santander
Mallorca
Ferrol

Teams

League table

Results

Top goalscorers

Top goalkeepers

Promotion playoffs

Relegation playoffs

External links
BDFútbol

Segunda División seasons
2
Spain